Q102 may refer to:

Quran 102, the 102nd chapter of the Islamic Holy book

Transportation
 Q102 (New York City bus)

Radio stations
 Q102 (Pirate Station) in London, United Kingdom; the precursor to XFM London
 Q102.9 in Derry, Northern Ireland
 Dublin's Q102 in Dublin, Ireland
 KOOO in La Vista, Nebraska (former incarnation)
 KQIC in Willmar, Minnesota
 KQRA in Springfield, Missouri
 KQST in Flagstaff, Arizona
 KRBQ in San Francisco, California
 KDGE in Fort Worth/Dallas, Texas (former incarnation)
 WEKV in Central City, Kentucky (former incarnation)
 WIFT in DuBois, Pennsylvania
 WIOQ in Philadelphia, Pennsylvania
 WKRQ in Cincinnati, Ohio
 WJST in Albany, Georgia (USA)
 WQTC-FM in Manitowoc, Wisconsin
 WQTU in Rome, Georgia (USA)
 WSQL in Brevard, North Carolina.
 WZDQ in Humboldt, Tennessee (former incarnation)